Karlis Arvīds Jurgens (27 May 1905 in Riga, Russian Empire – 17 December 1955 in Montreal, Quebec) was a Latvian footballer, ice hockey, basketball and bandy player who play played for Latvia national teams in all four of these sports. He was one of the best all-around Latvian sportsmen.

Football career
Jurgens began playing football with JKS Riga in 1921, in 1922 winning silver medals of Riga championship with the club, although he was mainly the second choice goalkeeper behind Hermanis Saltups. When in 1923 RFK was formed, Jurgens alongside most of the JKS footballers joined the new club which proved to be the flagman of Latvian football in the years to come.

From 1924 to 1926 Jurgens won three Latvian league titles with RFK and became a two-time winner of the Riga Football Cup. From 1924 he also played for Latvia national football team for which in the years to come he played nearly two times as many matches as his main competitor Harijs Lazdiņš from Olimpija Liepāja. He was a member of the Latvian football team at the 1924 Summer Olympics.

In 1927 Jurgens became the instigator for Riga Vanderer being formed as there was an incident involving Jurgens playing for different clubs in different sports which eventually led to Jurgens being arrested before a bandy match. He joined the newly founded Vanderer (alongside several other former RFK footballers) and together with the side rose to the Latvian Higher League over just two years. For the 1928/1929 season Jurgens left Latvia and played with Austria Wien becoming the first Latvian footballer to play abroad. Before the 1932 season Jurgens left Vanderer for ASK Riga with which he won his fourth Latvian championship in 1932. He played with ASK until the 1937/38 season after which he switched solely to refereeing eventually becoming one of the best football referees in Latvia. With Latvia national football team he played his last match in 1935. Jurgens continued to perform as a football referee after World War II when he lived in Germany and Canada.

Ice-hockey career
In ice hockey Jurgens won five Latvian league titles - from 1932 to 1937 when playing with ASK Riga hockey team. With Latvia national ice hockey team he played at the 1936 Winter Olympics. In ice hockey, unlike football Jurgens played as a forward and not as a goalkeeper.

Basketball career
Jurgens won the Latvian basketball league title when playing with RFK in 1925.

Honours

Football
Latvian Higher League: 1924, 1925, 1926, 1932
Riga Football Cup: 1924, 1925
Baltic Cup: 1928

Ice hockey
Latvian league: 1933, 1934, 1935, 1936, 1937

Basketball
Latvian league: 1925

References

External links
 
 
 

1905 births
1955 deaths
Footballers from Riga
Basketball players from Riga
People from Kreis Riga
Association football goalkeepers
Footballers at the 1924 Summer Olympics
Ice hockey players at the 1936 Winter Olympics
Latvia international footballers
Latvian bandy players
Latvian footballers
Latvian men's basketball players
Olympic footballers of Latvia
Olympic ice hockey players of Latvia
Ice hockey people from Riga